Jules Joffrin is a station on Line 12 of the Paris Métro in the Clignancourt district and the 18th arrondissement. It is located in Montmartre, between the town hall of the 18th arrondissement and the Notre-Dame de Clignancourt church.

The station opened on 31 October 1912 as part of the extension of the Nord-Sud company's line A from Pigalle. It was the northern terminus of the line until 23 August 1916 when it was extended to Porte de la Chapelle.  On 27 March 1931 line A became line 12 of the Métro. The station was named after Jules François Alexandre Joffrin (1846–1890) who was a councillor of the 18th arrondissement and a député.

Station layout

Gallery

References

External links
RATP – Neighbourhood Map for Jules Joffrin Station.

Paris Métro stations in the 18th arrondissement of Paris
Railway stations in France opened in 1912